The Boungome are an ethnic group from the northeastern region of Gabon.

References

Ethnic groups in Gabon